Alvin Sager Culver (June 11, 1908 – February 7, 1982) was an American football tackle who played in professionally the National Football League (NFL) with the Chicago Bears and the Green Bay Packers in 1932.  Culver played college football for the University of St. Thomas and University of Notre Dame before playing in the NFL.

References

1908 births
1982 deaths
American football tackles
Chicago Bears players
Green Bay Packers players
Notre Dame Fighting Irish football players
St. Thomas (Minnesota) Tommies football players
People from Wilmette, Illinois
Players of American football from Illinois